This is a list of electricity-generating power stations in the U.S. state of Arizona, sorted by type and name.   In 2020, Arizona had a total summer capacity of 27,115 MW through all of its power plants, and a net generation of 109,305 GWh. The corresponding electrical energy generation mix in 2021 was 44.4% natural gas, 29.1% nuclear, 13.2% coal, 5.4% hydroelectric, 6.2% solar, 1.5% wind, and 0.2% biomass. Small-scale solar, including customer-owned photovoltaic panels, delivered an additional net 3,355 GWh to the state's electrical grid. This compares as about one-half the amount generated by Arizona's utility-scale solar plants.

Arizona's Palo Verde Nuclear Generating Station located to the west of Phoenix is the nation's largest facility by annual energy production, and is the second largest facility by power capacity after Washington state's Grand Coulee Dam hydroelectric station.  The electricity generated by utility- and small-scale solar together surpassed the amount from all of Arizona's hydroelectric facilities for the first time in 2017.

Nuclear power stations

Fossil-fuel power stations
Data from the U.S. Energy Information Administration serves as a general reference.

Coal

Natural gas

Petroleum

Renewable power stations
Data from the U.S. Energy Information Administration serves as a general reference.

Biomass & Refuse

Hydroelectric dams

 Generating capacity at Hoover Dam is equally split between Arizona and Nevada.  Its total capacity was derated to 1,596 MW in June 2014 due to persistently low water storage levels and projected further declines.

Solar thermal plants

Solar photovoltaic plants

Wind farms

Storage power stations
Data from the U.S. Energy Information Administration serves as a general reference.

Battery storage

Pumped storage

Utility companies
Arizona Electric Power Cooperative
Arizona Public Service
Salt River Project
Tucson Electric Power
UniSource Energy Services

References

External links

U.S. Department of Energy Arizona Statistics
U.S. Department of Energy Arizona Quick Facts
SRP Power System

Lists of buildings and structures in Arizona
 
Arizona